Colette Pepin (born 8 July 1952) is a Canadian rower. She competed in the women's single sculls event at the 1976 Summer Olympics.

References

1952 births
Living people
Canadian female rowers
Olympic rowers of Canada
Rowers at the 1976 Summer Olympics
People from Saint-Laurent, Quebec
Rowers from Montreal
20th-century Canadian women